Gregory Edward Smith is a Canadian actor, writer, and director. Smith has appeared in several Hollywood films, and is known for his roles as Alan Abernathy in Small Soldiers, Ephram Brown on The WB television series Everwood, and as Dov Epstein on the ABC/Global police drama series Rookie Blue.

Early life
Smith was born in Toronto, Ontario, the son of Terrea (née Oster), a teacher from the United States, and Maurice Smith, a producer of low-budget films originally from the United Kingdom. Smith's mother appeared in several of the films that his father produced during the 1980s. Smith has two brothers, including fellow actor Douglas Smith, and a sister.

Career
Smith began acting when he was fourteen months old, and appeared in a Tide television commercial and in store catalogues. After a role in the 1994 children's film Andre, he starred in the 1995 direct-to-video release Leapin' Leprechauns! and its 1996 sequel, Spellbreaker: Secret of the Leprechauns. Also in 1996, Smith appeared opposite Michelle Trachtenberg in Harriet the Spy.

Smith subsequently starred in another direct-to-video film, Shadow Zone: My Teacher Ate My Homework, and appeared in three 1998 films: Krippendorf's Tribe, playing one of the children of the title character, The Climb, a drama also starring John Hurt, and the film Small Soldiers, in which Smith had a lead role opposite Kirsten Dunst, and for which he won a Young Artist Award for Best Performance in a Feature Film Leading Young Actor in 1999.

During the 2000s, Smith appeared in the Mel Gibson-led The Patriot (2000), played outlaw Jim Younger in the western American Outlaws (2001), was featured in the short-lived 2001 CBS drama series Kate Brasher, and was cast in a lead role on The WB Television Network show, Everwood, which became a success and ran from 2002 until June 2006. His role on the show was described by The Independent Weekly as "one of the best portrayals of a thoughtful, alienated teenager on television". For this role, Smith won a Young Artist Award for Best Performance in a TV series (Comedy or Drama) Leading Young Actor in 2003. During Everwood'''s filming, Smith owned a home on location in Park City, Utah.

In 2005, Smith appeared in the comedy-drama film Kids in America, which had a regional release in the U.S. During the film, Smith shared the longest on-screen kiss with Stephanie Sherrin, timed at almost six minutes. He also played in Zenon (Girl of the 21st Century) as Greg.

Smith next appeared in the independent film drama Nearing Grace, which received a limited theatrical release on October 13, 2006; in the film, which co-stars Ashley Johnson and Jordana Brewster, he plays Henry Nearing, a high senior in the 1970s. The News & Observer's review of the film described Smith's character as "self-deluded" and "perpetually brow-furrowing", although The Seattle Times noted that Smith was "likable", and HeraldNet's review specified that a "better movie will make [Smith] a star".

In 2007, Smith had a small role in The Seeker: The Dark is Rising as Max Stanton. Smith next appeared in the Richard Attenborough-directed period romance Closing the Ring, playing a younger version of Christopher Plummer's character Young Jack, as well as in the thriller Boot Camp, which co-stars Mila Kunis.

In 2008, Smith produced the direct release-to-DVD film Wieners, and made a guest appearance on the series Eli Stone. Smith returned to TV in the series Rookie Blue as Officer Dov Epstein. The series premiered on both ABC and Global TV in Canada on June 24, 2010. Making his television directing debut, he also directed five episodes.

On March 18, 2010, he was cast by Jim Sheridan for his 2011 thriller film Dream House; the movie was shot in Toronto.

He played Slick, the sadistic psychopath, in the 2011 independent film Hobo with a Shotgun''.

Personal life
On August 18, 2018, Smith married Canadian actress and model Taylor McKay. In 2021, the couple welcomed their first child, a son.

Filmography

Film

Television

Director

References

External links
 
 
 Exclusive: Everwoods Gregory Smith Returning to TV

American male child actors
American male film actors
American people of English descent
American male television actors
Canadian male child actors
Canadian male voice actors
Canadian male film actors
Canadian emigrants to the United States
Canadian people of American descent
Canadian people of English descent
Canadian male television actors
Living people
Male actors from Toronto
20th-century American male actors
21st-century American male actors
Year of birth missing (living people)